Abhinandananatha or Abhinandana Swami was the fourth Tirthankara of the present age (Avasarpini). He is said to have lived for 50 lakh purva. He was born to King Sanvara and Queen Siddhartha at Ayodhya in the Ikshvaku clan. His birth date was the second day of the Magh shukla month of the Indian calendar. According to Jain beliefs, he became a siddha, a liberated soul which has destroyed all of its Karma.

Life
Abhinandananatha or Abhinandana Swami was the fourth Tirthankara of the present age (Avasarpini). He is said to have lived for 50 lakh purva. He was born to King Samvara and Queen Siddhartha at Ayodhya in the Ikshvaku clan. His birth date was the second day of the Magh shukla month of the Indian calendar. He attained Kevala Jnana under priyangu tree. According to Jain beliefs, he became a siddha, a liberated soul which has destroyed all of its Karma. According to Jain tradition, his height was 350 dhanusha (1,050 meters).

Adoration 
Svayambhustotra by Jain monk, Acarya Samantabhadra is the adoration of twenty-four tirthankaras. Its five slokas (aphorisms) adore the qualities of Abhinandananātha. One such sloka is: Abhinandananatha is associated with Ape emblem, Piyala tree, Yakshesvara & Nayaka Yaksha and Vajrasrinkala & Kalika Yakshi.

Main temples 
 Chaturmukha Basadi, Gerusoppa

See also

God in Jainism
Arihant (Jainism)
Jainism and non-creationism

Notes

References
 
 
 
 
 

Tirthankaras
Solar dynasty

Ancient Indian people